The Great Debate was an era in Cuban history retroactively named by historians, that was defined by public debate about the future of Cuban economic policy that took place from 1962 to 1965. The debate began after Cuba fell into an economic crisis in 1962 after years of internal economic complications, United States sanctions, and the flight of professionals from Cuba. In 1962 Fidel Castro invited Marxist economists around the world to debate two main propositions. One proposition proposed by Che Guevara was that Cuba could bypass any capitalist then "socialist" transition period and immediately become an industrialized "communist" society if "subjective conditions" like public consciousness and vanguard action are perfected. The other proposition held by the Popular Socialist Party was that Cuba required a transitionary period as a mixed economy in which Cuba's sugar economy was maximized for profit before a "communist" society could be established. Eventually Fidel Castro would implement ideas of both and use the moral incentives proposed by Guevara but also focusing on developing the sugar economy rather than industrialization.

The Great Debate would result in somewhat of a compromise in which Fidel Castro used moral incentives rather than material incentives to motivate workers, and industrialization would be ignored in favor of a focus on the sugar economy. These policies would eventually culminate in the Revolutionary Offensive where the economy would be oriented in producing 10 million tons of sugar by 1970. The campaign failed and led to a reorientation of domestic Cuban politics.

Background 

In the months following the Cuban Revolution a pluralistic political alliance assembled to form the first provisional government. After elections failed to materialize, Batistianos were executed in the national sports stadium, and appeals for agrarian reform became popular, more moderate politicians started to become dissillusioned in the government and believed communists were slowly gaining control. By late 1959 the Central Intelligence Agency began training exiled Cubans for an invasion of Cuba. In early 1960 the Cuban government entered into a trade deal with the Soviet Union that exchanged Cuban sugar for Soviet oil. Throughout 1960 the United States would begin to create sanctions on Cuba and the Cuban government would retaliate by nationalizing American owned businesses. By 1961 U.S. trained rebels would attempt the Bay of Pigs Invasion and fail to overthrow the Castro government in Cuba. The original pluralistic platform of the Cuban Revolution had by then been constricted to just socialists sympathetic to the Eastern Bloc. By 1962 the Cuban government was reorganized under one political organization headed by Popular Socialist Party leader Anibal Escalante.

By 1962 Cuba was entering an economic crisis due to the rising sanctions it had experienced since 1959, the inability of the private sector to participate in the new mixed economy, and the flight of Cuban professionals who were uncomfortable with the political developments in Cuba. 1962 also saw the Escalante affair in which it was revealed that Escalante had given most positions of power in the new Integrated Revolutionary Organizations were given to Popular Socialist Party members. The economic crisis spurred on a reevaluation of the economic models proposed at the time and the previous Escalante affair motivated distrust in the Popular Socialist Party and their Soviet modeled propositions.

Debate 
In 1962 leftist economists from all over the world were invited to print their opinions in economic journals in Cuba about how Cuba should develop into a communist society. The two main spokespeople in the debate where Che Guevara who argued for an independent Cuban model to communism, and Carlos Rafael Rodríguez of the Popular Socialist Party who advocated for more of a "soviet" model towards communism which meant a development of capitalism before socialism and later communism.

Rodriguez advocated for material incentives given to individuals based on how well they created profit for an enterprise. Enterprises themselves will be "self-managed" like in the Soviet Union, rather than all managed by a central planner.

Guevara advocated for moral incentives as the main motivator to increase workers' production. All profits created by enterprises were to be given to the state budget, and the state budget would cover loses. Institutions that developed socialist consciousness were regarded as the most important element in maintaining a path to socialism rather than materially incentivized increases in production. Implementation of the profit-motive was regarded as a path towards capitalism and was one of the flaws of the Eastern bloc economies. The economy would also rely on mass mobilizations and centralized planning as a method for developing the economy. The main ideal that compromised the consciousness that would develop socialism was the praise of the "new man", a citizen that was only motivated by human solidarity and self-sacrifice.

Aftermath 
In 1966 the Cuban economy was reorganized on moral lines. Cuban propaganda stressed voluntarism and ideological motivations to increase productions. Material incentives were not given to workers who were more productive than others. Cuban intellectuals were expected to participate actively in creating a positive national ethos and ignore any desire to create "art for art's sake".

Cuba became more politically independent from the Soviet Union and instead focused it's foreign policy on third-world affairs. Guerilla groups in third-world anti-imperialist struggles would receive funding from the Cuban government.

In 1968 all non-agricultural private businesses were nationalized, central planning was done more on an ad-hoc basis and the entire Cuban economy was directed at producing a 10 million ton sugar harvest. These developments were generally inspired by the resolutions brought about by the Great Debate years earlier. The focus on sugar would eventually render all other facets of the Cuban economy underdeveloped and would be the ultimate legacy of the offensive.

References 

Aftermath of the Cuban Revolution
Cold War history of Cuba
Cold War history of the Soviet Union
History of Cuba
Fidel Castro
Nikita Khrushchev
Cuba–Soviet Union relations
1962 establishments in Cuba
1965 disestablishments in Cuba
1960s in Cuba